Mahir Amiraslanov (born 12 May 1997) is an Azerbaijani freestyle wrestler. He competed at the 57 kg in the 2019 European Games and won the gold medal. Amiraslanov has also claimed gold medal at the 4th Islamic Solidarity Games in Baku.

References

External links
 

1997 births
Living people
Wrestlers at the 2019 European Games
European Games competitors for Azerbaijan
European Games medalists in wrestling
Azerbaijani male sport wrestlers
European Wrestling Championships medalists
Islamic Solidarity Games medalists in wrestling
Islamic Solidarity Games competitors for Azerbaijan
21st-century Azerbaijani people